Dmitri Antonovich Volkogonov (22 March 1928 – 6 December 1995) was a Soviet and Russian historian and colonel general who was head of the Soviet military's psychological warfare department. After research in secret Soviet archives (both before and after the dissolution of the union), he published a biography of Joseph Stalin and Vladimir Lenin, among others. Despite being a committed Stalinist and Marxist–Leninist ideologue for most of his career, Volkogonov came to repudiate communism and the Soviet system within the last decade of his life before his death from cancer in 1995.

Through his research in the restricted archives of the Soviet Central Committee, Volkogonov discovered facts that contradicted the official Soviet version of events, and the cult of personality that had been built up around Lenin and Stalin. Volkogonov published books that contributed to the strain of liberal Russian thought that emerged during Glasnost in the late 1980s and the post-Soviet era of the early 1990s.

Early life
Volkogonov was born on 22 March 1928 in Chita, Eastern Siberia. Volkogonov was the son of a collective farm manager and a schoolteacher. In 1937, when he was eight, Volkogonov's father was arrested and shot during Stalin's purges for being found in possession of a pamphlet by Bukharin, who had fallen out of favor with Stalin and who was arrested that year. This was something Volkogonov only found out years later while doing his own research in the restricted archives in Moscow. His mother was sent to a labor camp, where she died during World War II. The family was "exiled to Krasnoyarsk in Western Siberia: Volkogonov joked that as they were already in the Far East, and Stalin was not in the habit of sending his political prisoners to Hawaii, they had to be sent west."

Volkogonov entered the military at the age of seventeen in 1945, which was common for many orphans. He studied at the Lenin Military-Political Academy in Moscow in 1961, transferring to the Soviet Army's propaganda department in 1970. There he wrote propaganda pamphlets and manuals on psychological warfare and gained a reputation as a hardliner.

It was as early as the 1950s, while a young Army officer, that Volkogonov first discovered information that created cognitive dissonance within himself. While reading early journals of Party members from the 1920s, Volkogonov realized "how stifled and sterile political debate in the Soviet Union had become in comparison to the early days." Khrushchev's 1956 secret speech further solidified this thought within him, but he kept these thoughts to himself at that time.

During the decades that Volkogonov headed the Department of Special Propaganda, he visited Angola, Ethiopia, the Middle East and Afghanistan. He "enjoyed a rapid rise in the Soviet Army as a specialist in charge of psychological and ideological warfare. Only a fully committed Communist could qualify for these posts, and he earned his credentials by grinding out propagandistic and agitational screeds." "But even as he was indoctrinating troops in Communist orthodoxy, General Volkogonov was struggling with private doubts based on the horrors he discovered hidden in the archives". Volkogonov also had the opportunity to view the conditions of various client states during the Cold War. While these countries received military aid, Volkogonov later recalled, "...they all became poorer; their economies were collapsing everywhere. And I came to the conclusion that the Marxist model was a real historic blind alley, and that we, too, were caught in a historic trap."

Researching Stalin
Volkogonov was a fervent ideologue until the end of the 1970s, and devoted his energy to spreading Marxism–Leninism within the military. Only with the most impeccable communist credentials did Volkogonov access the most secret Soviet archives. While reading in the archives during the Brezhnev years, Volkogonov "found documents that astounded him — papers that revealed top Communists as cruel, dishonest and inept". Thus, while Volkogonov was actively writing and editing Soviet propaganda materials for troops, "[he] was engaged in a lengthy, tortured but very private process of re-evaluating Soviet history."

Volkogonov began writing the biography of Stalin in 1978. He completed it by 1983, but it was banned by the Central Committee. It was published under Mikhail Gorbachev's policy of Glasnost before the dissolution of the Soviet Union. The publication of the book on Stalin within Russia made Volkogonov "a pariah among his fellow senior officers".

Although Volkogonov approached Lenin in the Stalin biography in a rather conventional way, he was passionate in his indictment of the Stalinist system. As he later remarked, "It immediately made me many enemies."

"Volkogonov admitted publicly that, like many senior Soviet officials, he had lived two mental lives, rising higher and higher in his career while burrowing deeper in the archives, as if symbolically undermining the system that had nurtured him."

He had been director of the Institute of Military History since 1985, where he was heavily involved in research and writing. While there, Volkogonov compiled a two-volume collection of data on 45,000 Red Army officers who were arrested during the purges of the 1930s, in which 15,000 were shot.

While the Stalin biography caused friction, everything really came to a head in June 1991, when he was forced to resign. Volkogonov had shown the other senior officers at the Institute a draft of the first volume of a 10-volume official Soviet history of World War II. In it, Volkogonov criticized Stalin's management of the war and his liquidation of Soviet officers.

One British historian, summarizing Volkogonov's criticisms of Stalin's military role in World War II, then notes that "a number of officers at the Institute of Military History who had fought on the Eastern Front were critical of Volkogonov's writings on the war because he had never set foot on a battlefield. He was, they said, an 'armchair-general'."

"Accused of blackening the name of the army, as well as that of the Communist Party and the Soviet state, and personally attacked by Minister of Defense Yazov," and under pressure from Gorbachev, Volkogonov resigned.

Advisor to Yeltsin and 1990s Stances

After the failed 1991 Soviet coup d'état attempt by communist hardliners in August 1991, followed by the dissolution of the Soviet Union in December 1991, Volkogonov became the special adviser for defence issues to the Russian President Boris Yeltsin.

In the early 1990s, Volkogonov was "the chairman of the commission investigating the hitherto unknown fates of allied prisoners of war in Soviet camps, chairman of the parliamentary committee for KGB and Communist Party archives." The second parliamentary committee released 78 million files to public access. As part of this process, Volkogonov was able to personally review "many documents of the Communist Party Central Committee and the Politburo." This declassification of state and Party papers allowed historians access which had never been allowed going back to the early formation of the Soviet Union seventy years before.

When notice of Volkogonov's research became known in the West, inquiries came to him from Alger Hiss and his lawyer in the United States. In 1948, Hiss had been accused of being a spy for the Soviet Union. When Hiss's lawyer contacted Volkogonov to check the KGB archives for record of Hiss as a spy, The New York Times reported:  "Not a single document, and a great amount of materials has been studied, substantiates the allegation that Mr. A. Hiss collaborated with the intelligence services of the Soviet Union," the official, Gen. Dmitry A. Volkogonov, chairman of the Russian Government's military intelligence archives, declared. He called the espionage accusations against Mr. Hiss "completely groundless."

Later Volkogonov took issue with what amounted to exoneration of Hiss. In a New York Times article entitled "Russian General Retreats on Hiss," Volkogonov clarified: I was not properly understood... The Ministry of Defense also has an intelligence service, which is totally different, and many documents have been destroyed. I only looked through what the K.G.B. had. All I said was that I saw no evidence."

Responding to Volkogonov's last remarks, Hiss himself stated: "If he and his associates haven't examined all the files, I hope they will examine the others, and they will show the same thing."

Volkogonov co-chaired a U.S.-Russia Joint Commission on Prisoners of War, "and continued, always, to write." Volkogonov fell out of favor with Yeltsin in 1994, after opposing the use of force to solve ethnic disputes within areas of the former Soviet Union. Specifically, Volkogonov felt that Yeltsin was taking "the advice of wrong-headed counselors" in deciding to invade Chechnya.

Biography of Lenin and Critique of Leninism

Although Volkogonov began intensive research into Lenin in 1990, by the late 1980s he was actually already arriving at his own conclusion regarding Lenin's role.  He eventually became thoroughly disillusioned with Leninism.

Lenin's archives were housed in the former Central Committee building on Moscow's Staraya Square. Deep in the basement of the huge grey building were shelves holding metal boxes that contained all the written records associated with Lenin. Volkogonov explained, "As I saw more and more closed Soviet archives, as well as the large Western collections at Harvard University and the Hoover Institution in California, Lenin's profile altered in my estimation".

Volkogonov always used to say "that in his own mind, Lenin was the last bastion to fall." He said that the turning point was when he discovered one of Lenin's orders calling for the public hanging of Kulak peasants in 1918:

"It never occurred to us", he wrote, "that the 'breakthrough' of October 1917 might be a counter-revolution, when compared to the events of February of that year."

Character
When Volkogonov's editor for the English editions of his books, Harold Shukman, first met him in Oxford, England in 1989, he found Volkogonov to be "utterly unlike [his] idea of a Soviet general." Shukman explained: "He did not strut or swagger, or drink or smoke, and in the many different situations in which I was to see him — in other countries, in Russia, with academics, etc., he was invariably easy-going and relaxed, and plainly popular."

By the end of his life, Volkogonov had "firmly committed himself to the view that Russia's only hope in 1917 lay in the liberal and social democratic coalition that emerged in the February Revolution."

Volkogonov told his editor that the "spiritual strength" that he displayed in his last years was derived from undergoing a Christian baptism.
As one Los Angeles Times writer described Volkogonov: "For exposing truths and exploding myths, Volkogonov was often accused of treason and treachery. But he never retreated." Volkogonov was under tremendous pressures at the time. For instance he related that when he would enter the Russian Parliament (where he had held a seat as a liberal since the Gorbachev era), he would be met by Communist legislators who would "line up at the door and shout insults." Of this Volkogonov commented at the time, "I take these shouts as sounds of historical praise."

Last years

"Despite his undergoing extensive surgery for colon and liver cancer" in 1991, the pace of both his political activity and the publication of his writings increased sharply.

During the August 1991 coup attempt in which a hardliners attempted to wrest control from Gorbachev in an attempt to reassert the Communist Party's power in the Soviet Union, Volkogonov was in a hospital in London. When Volkogonov saw the news of the coup on television, he said to his editor, "So, they've done it." Defense Minister Dmitry Yazov, who had fired Volkogonov from the Institute three months earlier, had told him, "something will happen to get rid of the likes of you." From his hospital bed Volkogonov broadcast an appeal on the BBC to the Soviet army to not obey the orders of the coup leaders.

Volkogonov was the co-chairman of Task Force Russia, an American Russian organization tasked with finding American POWs in Russia. He told a US Senate committee that 730 American airmen had been captured on Cold War spy flights.
 
Volkogonov died from cancer in December 1995 at the age of 67. His family donated his papers to the United States Library of Congress.

Volkogonov is most famous for his trilogy Leaders (Вожди, or Vozhdi), which consists of the three books about: Vladimir Lenin (Lenin: A New Biography, 1994); Leon Trotsky (Trotsky: The Eternal Revolutionary, 1992); and Joseph Stalin (Stalin: Triumph and Tragedy).

He also finished just before his death Autopsy for an Empire: the Seven Leaders Who Built the Soviet Regime (Russian title: Sem Vozhdei). The book presents chapters on "the seven leaders of the Soviet Union: Lenin, Stalin, Khrushchev, Brezhnev, Andropov, Chernenko and Gorbachev." Volkogonov was in the Soviet Army during the reign of six of the seven leaders, and he had "direct working contact" with four of those leaders in his role as a colonel-general. The English editions were essentially condensed versions of the much longer Russian originals, as acknowledged by their translator and editor Harold Shukman.

Works
 Mythical "Threat" and the Real Danger to Peace, Novosti Press Agency Publishing House, 1982
 The Psychological War, Progress Publishers, 1986
 The Army and Social Progress, Progress Publishers, 1987
 Stalin: Triumph and tragedy, Grove Weidenfeld, 1991 
 
 Trotsky: The Eternal Revolutionary, Free Press, 1996 
 The Rise and Fall of the Soviet Empire: Political Leaders from Lenin to Gorbachev, HarperCollins Publishers, 1998 
 Autopsy for an Empire: the Seven Leaders Who Built the Soviet Regime, Free Press, 1999

References

Further reading
 McInnes, Neil. "Volkogonov's journey" National Interest 08849382, (Winter96/97), Issue 46 online

External links 

1928 births
1995 deaths
20th-century Russian historians
People from Chita, Zabaykalsky Krai
Advisers to the President of Russia
Corresponding Members of the Russian Academy of Sciences
First convocation members of the State Duma (Russian Federation)
Lenin Military Political Academy alumni
Recipients of the Lenin Komsomol Prize
Recipients of the Medal "For Distinction in Guarding the State Border of the USSR"
Recipients of the Order "For Merit to the Fatherland", 3rd class
Recipients of the Order "For Service to the Homeland in the Armed Forces of the USSR", 3rd class
Recipients of the Order of the Red Banner of Labour
Recipients of the Order of the Red Star
State Prize of the Russian Federation laureates
Historians of communism
Historians of Russia
Stalinism-era scholars and writers
Russian military historians
Russian philosophers
Soviet colonel generals
Soviet historians
Soviet philosophers
Deaths from brain tumor
Deaths from cancer in Russia
Burials at Kuntsevo Cemetery